Ky Nam Le Duc is a Vietnamese Canadian film director and screenwriter. He is most noted for his 2009 short film Land of Men (Terre des hommes), which won the award for Best Canadian Short Film at the 2009 CFC Worldwide Short Film Festival and was a Genie Award nominee for Best Live Action Short Drama at the 30th Genie Awards in 2010.

Le Duc's second short film, Powder (Poudre), was released in 2010.

His debut feature film, Oscillations, premiered at the 2017 Festival du nouveau cinéma. He followed up in 2019 with The Greatest Country in the World (Le Meilleur pays du monde).

References

External links

21st-century Canadian screenwriters
21st-century Canadian male writers
Canadian male screenwriters
Film directors from Montreal
Writers from Montreal
Canadian people of Vietnamese descent
Université du Québec à Montréal alumni
Living people
Asian-Canadian filmmakers
Year of birth missing (living people)